Bette Midler is the second studio album by American singer Bette Midler, released in 1973 on the Atlantic Records label. Produced by Arif Mardin and Barry Manilow, Bette Midler includes Midler's interpretations of Johnny Mercer and Hoagy Carmichael's "Skylark", Berthold Brecht and Kurt Weill's "Surabaya Johnny", Bob Dylan's "I Shall Be Released" and Glenn Miller's "In the Mood" as well as a Phil Spector medley.

Bette Midler reached No. 6 on the US albums chart and was later awarded a Gold Disc by the RIAA.

The album was released on CD for the first time in 1989. A remastered version of the album was released by Atlantic Records/Warner Music in 1995.

Track listing

Personnel

 Bette Midler – lead vocals
 Barry Manilow – piano, percussion, backing vocals, musical arranger, musical conductor
 Ken Ascher – keyboards
 Pat Rebillot – keyboards
 Don Grolnick – keyboards
 David Spinozza – guitars
 Cornell Dupree – guitars
 Frank Vento – guitars
 Hugh McCracken – guitars
 Stu Woods – bass guitars
 Chuck Rainey – bass guitar
 William Salter – bass guitar
 Milt Hinton – double bass
 Will Lee – bass guitar
 Rick Marotta – drums
 Grady Tate – drums
 Bernard Purdie – drums
 Steve Gadd – drums
 Luther Rix – drums, percussion
 Ralph MacDonald – percussion
 Arif Mardin – percussion
 Kenneth Bichel – synthesizers
 Gene Orloff – concert master
 Gail Kantor – background vocals
 Merle Miller – background vocals
 Sylvia Shemwell – background vocals
 Myrna Smith – background vocals
 Tasha Thomas – background vocals
 Shirley Brewer – background vocals
 Ann S. Clark – background vocals
 Sharon Redd – background vocals
 Robin Grean – background vocals
 Charlotte Crossley – background vocals

Production

 Arif Mardin – producer
 Barry Manilow – producer
 Gene Paul – recording engineer
 Lew Hahn – recording engineer
 Jimmy Douglass – recording engineer for additional recordings
 Robbert Warner – recording engineer for additional recordings
 Elliot Scheiner – recording engineer for additional recordings
 Buzz Richmond – recording engineer for additional recordings
 Scott Schreckengosf – recording engineer for additional recordings
 George Piros – mastering
 Dennis King – mastering
 Richard Amsel – cover art
 Lee Gurst – backliner photo
 Loring Eutemey – album design
 Recorded at Atlantic Recording Studios, New York, N.Y.
 Additional recordings at A & R Studios, New York, N.Y.; Atlantic Recording Studios, New York, N.Y. & Kaye / Smith Studios, Seattle, Washington
 Re-mixed by: Lew Hahn & Arif Mardin

Charts

Weekly charts

Year-end charts

Certifications and sales

References

1973 albums
Bette Midler albums
Albums produced by Arif Mardin
Atlantic Records albums